Cernuto is an Italian surname. Notable people with the surname include:

Francesco Cernuto (born 1992), Italian footballer
John Cernuto (born 1944), American poker player
Holly Beth Vincent (born Cernuto in 1956), American singer-songwriter

Italian-language surnames